The Râul Galben is a left tributary of the Râul Mare in Romania. It discharges into the Râul Mare in Sântămăria-Orlea. Upstream of the confluence with the Răchitova, the river is also known as Densuș. The river flows through the town Hațeg.

References

Rivers of Romania
Rivers of Hunedoara County